Local anesthesia is any technique to induce the absence of sensation in a specific part of the body, generally for the aim of inducing local analgesia, that is, local insensitivity to pain, although other local senses may be affected as well. It allows patients to undergo surgical and dental procedures with reduced pain and distress. In many situations, such as cesarean section, it is safer and therefore superior to general anesthesia.

The following terms are often used interchangeably:
 Local anesthesia, in a strict sense, is anesthesia of a small part of the body such as a tooth or an area of skin.
 Regional anesthesia is aimed at anesthetizing a larger part of the body such as a leg or arm.
 Conduction anesthesia encompasses a great variety of local and regional anesthetic techniques.

Medical

A local anesthetic is a drug that causes reversible local anesthesia and a loss of nociception. When it is used on specific nerve pathways (nerve block), effects such as analgesia (loss of pain sensation) and paralysis (loss of muscle power) can be achieved. Clinical local anesthetics belong to one of two classes: aminoamide and aminoester local anesthetics. Synthetic local anesthetics are structurally related to cocaine. They differ from cocaine mainly in that they have no abuse potential and do not act on the sympathoadrenergic system, i.e. they do not produce hypertension or local vasoconstriction, with the exception of Ropivacaine and Mepivacaine that do produce weak vasoconstriction. Unlike other forms of anesthesia, a local can be used for a minor procedure in a surgeon's office as it does not put you into a state of unconsciousness. However, the physician should have a sterile environment available before doing a procedure in their office.

Local anesthetics vary in their pharmacological properties and they are used in various techniques of local anesthesia such as:
 Topical anesthesia (surface) - Similar to topical gel numbing before getting injected with Lidocaine.
 Infiltration
 Plexus block

Adverse effects depend on the local anesthetic method and site of administration discussed in depth in the local anesthetic sub-article, but overall, adverse effects can be:
 localized prolonged anesthesia or paresthesia due to infection, hematoma, excessive fluid pressure in a confined cavity, and severing of nerves & support tissue during injection.
 systemic reactions such as depressed CNS syndrome, allergic reaction, vasovagal episode, and cyanosis due to local anesthetic toxicity.
 lack of anesthetic effect due to infectious pus such as an abscess.

Non-medical local anesthetic techniques
Local pain management that uses other techniques than analgesic medication include:
 Transcutaneous electrical nerve stimulation, which has been found to be ineffective for lower back pain, however, it might help with diabetic neuropathy.
 Pulsed radiofrequency, neuromodulation, direct introduction of medication and nerve ablation may be used to target either the tissue structures and organ/systems responsible for persistent nociception or the nociceptors from the structures implicated as the source of chronic pain.

See also

 Continuous wound infiltration

References

External links
 New York School of Regional Anesthesia
 Anesthesia Books 
 General information and tutorials in peripheral regional anesthesia
 worldanaesthesia.org Free online manual of regional anaesthesia- John Hyndman
 Clinical Use of Peripheral Nerve Stimulators and The Neuromuscular Junction
 ESRA - The European Society for Regional Anaesthesia Congress

Anesthesia